Priddis is a hamlet in Alberta, Canada within Foothills County.

The hamlet is located in Census Division No. 6 and in the federal riding of Macleod. It was named for Charles Priddis, who homesteaded along the Fish Creek in 1886.

Demographics 
The population of Priddis according to the 2003 municipal census conducted by Foothills County is 79.

See also 
List of communities in Alberta
List of hamlets in Alberta

References 

Foothills County
Hamlets in Alberta